Apocrita is a suborder of insects in the order Hymenoptera. It includes wasps, bees, and ants, and consists of many families. It contains the most advanced hymenopterans and is distinguished from Symphyta by the narrow "waist" (petiole) formed between the first two segments of the actual abdomen; the first abdominal segment is fused to the thorax, and is called the propodeum. Therefore, it is general practice, when discussing the body of an apocritan in a technical sense, to refer to the mesosoma and metasoma (or gaster) rather than the "thorax" and "abdomen", respectively. The evolution of a constricted waist was an important adaption for the parasitoid lifestyle of the ancestral apocritan, allowing more maneuverability of the female's ovipositor. The ovipositor either extends freely or is retracted, and may be developed into a stinger for both defense and paralyzing prey. Larvae are legless and blind, and either feed inside a host (plant or animal) or in a nest cell provisioned by their mothers.

Apocrita has historically been split into two groups, Parasitica and Aculeata. Aculeata is a clade whose name is in standard use. "Parasitica" is not a clade, as it is paraphyletic: the clade would contain the Aculeata. "Parasitica" is therefore a rankless grouping in many present classifications, if it appears at all. 

Parasitica comprises the majority of hymenopteran insects, its members living as parasitoids. Most species are small, with the ovipositor adapted for piercing. In some hosts, the parasitoids induce metamorphosis prematurely, and in others it is prolonged. There are even species that are hyperparasites, or parasitoids on other parasitoids. The Parasitica lay their eggs inside or on another insect (egg, larva or pupa) and their larvae grow and develop within or on that host. The host is nearly always killed. Many parasitic hymenopterans are used as biological control agents to control pests, such as caterpillars, true bugs and hoppers, flies, and weevils.

Aculeata is a monophyletic group that includes those species in which the female's ovipositor is modified into a stinger to inject venom. Groups within Aculeata include the familiar ants, bees, and various types of parasitic and predatory wasps; it also includes all of the social hymenopterans.
Among the nonparasitic and nonsocial Aculeata, larvae are fed with captured prey (typically alive and paralyzed) or may be fed pollen and nectar. The social Aculeata feed their young prey (paper wasps and hornets), or pollen and nectar (bees), or perhaps seeds, fungi, or nonviable eggs (ants).

Extant families and superfamilies 

The Apocrita contains a large number of families. Some traditional taxa such as the Parasitica (containing many families of parasitoid wasps) have been found on molecular analysis to be paraphyletic. Parasitoidism evolved once, and it is found today across most Apocritan families, though it has been secondarily lost several times. The phylogenetic tree gives a condensed overview of the phylogeny, illustrated with major groups. The sawflies are paraphyletic as the Apocrita evolved inside that group. The tree is not fully resolved.

Cladogram of Apocrita after

Suborder Apocrita
Infraorder Aculeata
Superfamily Apoidea (bees and sphecoid wasps)
Family Ampulicidae (cockroach wasps)
Family Andrenidae (mining bees)
Family Apidae (carpenter bees, digger bees, cuckoo bees, bumble bees, orchid bees, stingless bees, and honeybees)
Family Colletidae (yellow-faced bees and plasterer bees)
Family Crabronidae (sand wasps, bee wolves, etc.)
Family Halictidae ("sweat bees")
Family Heterogynaidae
Family Megachilidae (leaf-cutting bees)
Family Melittidae
Family Stenotritidae
Family Sphecidae (digger wasps)
Superfamily Chrysidoidea
Family Bethylidae
Family Chrysididae (cuckoo wasps)
Family Dryinidae
Family Embolemidae
Family Plumariidae
Family Sclerogibbidae
Family Scolebythidae
Superfamily Formicoidea
Family Formicidae (ants)
Superfamily Pompiloidea
Family Mutillidae (velvet ants)
Family Myrmosidae
Family Pompilidae (spider wasps)
Family Sapygidae
Superfamily Scolioidea
Family Scoliidae
Superfamily Tiphioidea
Family Bradynobaenidae
Family Sierolomorphidae
Family Tiphiidae
Superfamily Thynoidea
Family Chyphotidae
Family Thynnidae
Superfamily Vespoidea
Family Rhopalosomatidae
Family Vespidae (paper wasps, potter wasps, hornets, pollen wasps, yellowjackets)
Proctotrupomorpha
Superfamily Chalcidoidea
Family Agaonidae (fig wasps)
Family Aphelinidae
Family Chalcididae (chalcid wasps)
Family Encyrtidae
Family Eucharitidae
Family Eulophidae
Family Eupelmidae
Family Eurytomidae (seed chalcids)
Family Leucospidae
Family Mymaridae (fairyflies) – the smallest of all insects
Family Ormyridae
Family Perilampidae
Family Pteromalidae
Family Rotoitidae
Family Signiphoridae
Family Tanaostigmatidae
Family Tetracampidae
Family Torymidae
Family Trichogrammatidae
Superfamily Cynipoidea
Family Austrocynipidae
Family Cynipidae (gall wasps)
Family Figitidae
Family Ibaliidae
Family Liopteridae
Superfamily Diaprioidea
Family Austroniidae
Family Diapriidae
Family Maamingidae
Family Monomachidae
Superfamily Mymarommatoidea
Family Mymarommatidae
Superfamily Platygastroidea
 Family Geoscelionidae
 Family Janzenellidae
 Family Neuroscelionidae
 Family Nixoniidae
 Family Platygastridae
 Family †Proterosceliopsidae
 Family Scelionidae
 Family Sparasionidae
Superfamily Proctotrupoidea
Family Heloridae
Family Pelecinidae
Family Peradeniidae
Family Proctorenyxidae
Family Proctotrupidae
Family Roproniidae
Family Vanhorniidae
Superfamily Stephanoidea
Family Stephanidae
Superfamily Trigonaloidea
Family †Maimetshidae
Family Trigonalidae
Superfamily Ceraphronoidea
Family Ceraphronidae
Family Megaspilidae
Superfamily Evanioidea
Family Aulacidae
Family Evaniidae (ensign wasps)
Family Gasteruptiidae
Superfamily Ichneumonoidea
Family Braconidae
Family Ichneumonidae (ichneumon wasps)
Superfamily Megalyroidea
Family Megalyridae

References

External links

 Suborder Apocrita – Ants, Bees and Wasps – BugGuide.Net — images and other information
 Tree of Life
 Balades Entomologiques — "entomological walks" with images 

 
Insect suborders
Taxa named by Carl Eduard Adolph Gerstaecker